Rajani Etimarpu (born 9 June 1990) is an Indian field hockey and member of the India women's national field hockey team. She hails from Andhra Pradesh and plays as a goalkeeper. She was India's goalkeeper at the 2014–15 Women's FIH Hockey World League. The player has successfully 110 international caps to her credit. She also served as the goalkeeper at Hawke's Bay Cup 2015 held in New Zealand.

References

External links
 
Rajani Etimarpu at Hockey India

Living people
Indian female field hockey players
Field hockey players from Andhra Pradesh
Female field hockey goalkeepers
1990 births
Sportswomen from Andhra Pradesh
21st-century Indian women
21st-century Indian people
Field hockey players at the 2018 Asian Games
Asian Games silver medalists for India
Asian Games medalists in field hockey
Medalists at the 2018 Asian Games
Field hockey players at the 2010 Commonwealth Games
Field hockey players at the 2018 Commonwealth Games
Field hockey players at the 2022 Commonwealth Games
Commonwealth Games bronze medallists for India
Commonwealth Games medallists in field hockey
Medallists at the 2022 Commonwealth Games